The Tang Te-chang Memorial Park is a memorial park in West Central District, Tainan, Taiwan  to commemorate late lawyer Tang Te-chang.

History

Empire of Japan
In 1907, local residents erected a statue of Kodama Gentarō, the fourth Governor-General of Taiwan, one year after his passing. The statue was imported to Taiwan from Kingdom of Italy in 1904 and shipped to Tainan in 1905. In 1911, the park became a traffic circle and the wall surrounding the park was torn down. In 1916, the park was named Kodama Park(児玉公園) and subsequently Taisho Park (大正公園).

Republic of China
After the handover of Taiwan from Japan to the Republic of China in 1945, the park was renamed Min Sheng Green Park. On 13 March 1947, lawyer Tang Te-chang was shot dead at the park as part of the February 28 Incident. In 1997, the park was renamed Tang Te-chang Memorial Park by Tainan Mayor George Chang to honor Tang. He erected a bust of Tang.

On 10 March 2013, various organizations and the PCT Church and Society Committee convened at the park to commemorate the life and legacy of Tang. On 22 February 2014, the statue of Sun Yat-sen was torn down and painted with red color by the Alliance of Referendum for Taiwan and its supporters. The act prompted the police to arrest the alliance leader although he was released shortly afterwards. In December 2015, the original head of Kodama statue was found by artists working at the old barracks of Imperial Japanese Army. On 20 September 2017, restoration work began at the park to better fit its Japanese-style surrounding buildings. The restoration costed NT$8 million and is estimated to be completed within 150 days at the end of February 2018.

Architecture
The park is located at a traffic circle in Tainan city center. Seven streets converge to the traffic circle.

Transportation
The park is accessible within walking distance southwest of Tainan Station of Taiwan Railways.

See also
 List of tourist attractions in Taiwan

References

1907 establishments in Taiwan
Memorial parks in Taiwan
Roundabouts and traffic circles in Taiwan
Tourist attractions in Tainan